Shalem College (HaMerkaz HaAkademi Shalem) is a private liberal arts college in Jerusalem, Israel providing undergraduate education and founded with the aim of producing "broadly educated citizens for lives of influence and service." It is the only Israeli institution of higher education to offer a broad-based Core Curriculum as the basis for a first degree, as opposed to the general practice in Israeli universities and colleges of restricting a student's courses to a single department or field.

Candidates to the college are selected on the basis of exams, intellectual capabilities, and demonstrated commitment to public service. Accepted applicants receive substantial financial aid packages. The college is accredited by the Council for Higher Education in Israel.

History

Shalem College was founded in January 2013 following accreditation by the Council for Higher Education in Israel. It grew out of The Shalem Center, a think tank that aimed to enrich Israel’s intellectual discourse through research, publications, and public lectures. 
 
The Center was home to notable Israeli public figures, including former Israeli Ambassador to the United States Michael Oren, who wrote his definitive history of the Six-Day War while a fellow there, and the human-rights activist and Israel Prize winner Natan Sharansky, who currently teaches a seminar at the college on democracy and national identity.

Academics

Shalem College has pioneered the use of required courses for all students alongside a choice of major concentrations. Its Core Curriculum, the centerpiece of the college’s academic community, includes courses in philosophy, history, the natural and social sciences, literature, and the fine arts. It emphasizes the classic texts of both Judaism and Islam (the Hebrew Bible, the Talmud, and the Koran, among others) and courses on the history of the wider Middle East—subjects the college deems essential to meaningful citizenship in a modern Jewish state and active participation in Israel’s diverse society. The college also encourages the reading of primary sources. Most courses in the Core are taught in seminars of no more than 25 students.

After their first year, students choose one of three majors: the Interdisciplinary Program in Philosophy and Jewish Thought (IPJ), the Program in Middle Eastern and Islamic Studies (MEIS), or the Program in Strategy, Diplomacy, and Security (SDS). An additional major, in economics and policy, is planned for the coming years.

The Department of Middle Eastern and Islamic Studies is notable for requiring fluency in Arabic as a condition of its degree. The department pioneered the practice of bi-weekly, one-on-one sessions with native Arabic speakers and summer Arabic immersion programs to help students attain this goal.

The language of instruction at Shalem is Hebrew, although students are required to demonstrate a level of English proficiency as a condition of their admittance.

Citizenship and Peoplehood

The college features a comprehensive citizenship curriculum, including an experiential course on the major challenges in Israeli society and the “Israel Story” event series, part of the Asper Center for Zionist Studies. The series brings notable Israeli authors—including David Grossman, Meir Shalev, Eli Amir, and Micah Goodman—to campus to discuss texts that have shaped the nation’s narrative. The Shalem accelerator also encourages student initiatives for social change, several of which have become sustainable organizations and nonprofits organizations.

Through the Koret Jewish Peoplehood Project at Shalem College, students participate in annual delegations to the Bay Area and the AIPAC policy convention in Washington DC.

Leadership and Faculty
Middle East scholar Dr. Martin Kramer, a student of the British-American historian Bernard Lewis, served as the college’s first president, from 2013 to 2017. He was succeeded by Prof. Isaiah Gafni, a scholar of Jewish history in the Second Temple Period and the Sol Rosenbloom Chair of Jewish history at The Hebrew University of Jerusalem. The current president is Prof. Russ Roberts, the American economist, public intellectual, and John and Jean De Nault Research Fellow at Stanford University's Hoover Institution. He is also the founder of the popular podcast EconTalk.

Among the college's notable faculty are Daniel Gordis, the author and commentator on Israeli-American Jewish relations, who served as the chair of the Core Curriculum Department; Leon Kass, the Addie Clark Harding Professor Emeritus in the Committee on Social Thought and in the College at the University of Chicago, who serves as the Dean of the Faculty; inaugural Asper Chair of Zionist Studies Dr. Assaf Inbari, whose history of the kibbutz movement was nominated for Israel's highest literary honor; and Colonel (res.) Dr. Eran Lerman, the former deputy for foreign policy and international affairs at Israel’s National Security Council. The faculty also includes two Israel Prize winners: Prof. Yohanan Friedmann, an expert in Islamic history, and Prof. Yemima Ben-Menahem, a scholar of the philosophy of science, in particular modern physics.

Although the college had a reputation for being dominated by immigrants from the United States, it has reportedly "broke[n] out of the Anglo mold." The staff and student rosters span the political and religious spectrum, and the college is not affiliated with any political stance or ideology. Moreover, although no Arabs are currently enrolled, the school has made extensive efforts to boost diversity and to recruit students from the Arab sector.

Shalem College Press
Shalem College is home to Shalem College Press, established in 1995 with the goal of enriching Israel’s intellectual life by translating classic works of Western thought into Hebrew for the first time. Over the years, the Press expanded its mission to include Hebrew translations of contemporary works of political and social thought and English-language publications in the fields of Jewish thought and Zionism. Titles in its Leviathan Series, which include David Hume’s A Treatise of Human Nature, Thomas Hobbes’ Leviathan, Niccolò Machiavelli’s Discourses on Livy, and Friedrich Hayek’s The Road to Serfdom, among others, appear frequently in the syllabi of Israeli university courses.

Core Curriculum
At Shalem, the Core Curriculum is required of all students, regardless of their major.
Students read numerous classic works as part of the curriculum.

Western & Eastern Philosophy and Religion
 Greek Philosophy
 Modern Philosophy
 Introduction to Islam
 Introduction to Christianity
 Western and Eastern Religion and Philosophy

Jewish Thought
 The Hebrew Bible
 Rabbinic Literature
 Medieval Jewish Philosophy
 Contemporary Jewish and Zionist Thought

Literature, Art, and Music
 Western Literature I and II
 Hebrew Literature from Yehuda Leib Gordon to Nathan Alterman
 The Language of Music
 History of Art
 Expository and Academic Writing
 English Language

History and Social Sciences
 Applied Economics
 Philosophy of Economics
 Introduction to Social Sciences
 Western and Middle Eastern History I and II
 Israel as a Jewish and Democratic State

Mathematics and the Natural Sciences
 Statistics, Measurement, and Quantitative Reasoning
 Physics
 Biology
 Cognitive Science
 Science, Society, and Technology

See also
List of universities and colleges in Israel
Education in Israel

References

External links
 Shalem College Official Website
 Shalem College Official Website (Hebrew)

2013 establishments in Israel
Colleges in Israel
Educational institutions established in 2013
Universities and colleges in Jerusalem
Liberal arts colleges